Arthur Graham (born 1952) is a Scottish footballer.

 Arthur Graham may also refer to:

Skinny Graham (outfielder) (Arthur William Graham, 1909–1967), outfielder for the Boston Red Sox
Art Graham (born 1941), former American football wide receiver
Arthur W Graham III (1940–2008), timekeeper for the Indianapolis 500
Master Arthur Huntingdon, known as Arthur Graham, see The Tenant of Wildfell Hall#Characters

See also 
Graham Arthur (1936–2021), Australian rules footballer